Icon of the Adversary is the sixth studio album by the American band Psyclon Nine. It was officially released through Metropolis Records on August 24, 2018, the band's first album since Order of the Shadow: Act I and remix album Disorder: The Shadow Sessions. Psyclon Nine embarked on a month-long New York tour in support of the album, from August 17 to September 9, 2018, with support from industrial punk band The God Bombs.

Track listing

“The Last” ends at 4:00 and contains a hidden ambient modular track that starts at 5:00 until 14:24. It is, however, removed on the LP version of the album.

Personnel
Psyclon Nine
 Nero Bellum – vocals
 Rotny Ford – guitar, synth
 Tim Sköld – bass guitar
 Jon Siren – drums

References

2018 albums
Psyclon Nine albums